The governor of Illinois is the head of government of Illinois, and the various agencies and departments over which the officer has jurisdiction, as prescribed in the state constitution.  It is a directly elected position, votes being cast by popular suffrage of residents of the state. The governor is responsible for enacting laws passed by the Illinois General Assembly. Illinois is one of 14 states that does not have a gubernatorial term-limit along with Connecticut, Idaho, Iowa, Massachusetts, Minnesota, New York, North Dakota, Texas, Utah, Washington, Wisconsin, District of Columbia, Vermont, New Hampshire and Puerto Rico.   The governor is commander-in-chief of the state's land, air and sea forces when they are in state service.

The 43rd and current governor is J. B. Pritzker, a Democrat who took office on January 14, 2019.

Qualifications
The term of office of governor of Illinois is 4 years, and there is no limit on the number of terms a governor may serve. Inauguration takes place on the second Monday in January following a gubernatorial election in November. A single term ends four years later. A governor is required to be:

 at least 25 years old
 a United States citizen
 a resident of Illinois for 3 years prior to election

Succession

If the incumbent governor is no longer able or permitted to fulfill the duties of the office of governor, the line of succession is as follows:

Residence
The governor is allowed the occupancy of the Illinois Governor's Mansion in Springfield, the state capital. Its first occupant was Governor Joel Aldrich Matteson, who took residence at the mansion in 1855.  It is one of three oldest governor's residences in continuous use in the United States.

The governor is also given the use of two official residences on the state fair grounds, located in Springfield and DuQuoin.  The official residence in DuQuoin is Hayes House.  Governors have traditionally used these residences part of the year.

However, some governors, such as Rod Blagojevich, have chosen to not use the governor's homes as their primary residence, instead commuting either by car or plane to Springfield from their home cities. Many Chicago-based governors also have done much of their business out of the governor's office in Chicago's James R. Thompson Center, an office building owned by the state named for former governor James R. Thompson (1977-1991) Illinois' longest-serving governor.

See also
List of governors of Illinois
Neil Hartigan, General Counsel to Governor Pritzker

Notes
1. Former governor of Illinois Bruce Rauner, who was independently wealthy, has previously stated that he would only accept $1 in salary. In 2015, the Council of State Governments reported that Rauner had returned all but $1 of his salary to the State of Illinois. However, the pay rate for the title of governor in Illinois remains at $177,412.
2. After billionaire J.B. Pritzker spent a record a $171.5 million of his own personal fortune to fund his campaign to win the governor's seat, he decided not to accept a state salary during his time in office.

References

External links
 
 Information on the Iliinois Governor's Mansion on the webpage of the Illinois Office of the Governor
 Burial places of Illinois Governors
 Article V (Executive) in the Illinois Constitution

 1818 establishments in Illinois Territory